Mount Gabriel is a mountain on the Mizen Peninsula immediately to the north of the town of Schull in West Cork, Ireland.

Mount Gabriel is 407m high and is the highest eminence in the coastal zone south and east of Bantry Bay. A roadway serving the radar installations on the summit is open to the public.

From the peak of Mount Gabriel, there are views south over Schull Harbour and Long Island Bay.  To the east and southeast, the views take in Roaringwater Bay and its many islands, known as Carbery's Hundred Isles. North and west are the mountains of the Beara Peninsula and south Kerry.

Fastnet Rock is approximately 18 km to the south, and is visible in fine weather.

Mining 

On the southern and eastern slopes of the mountain is evidence of Bronze Age mining.  The principal ore mined was copper.  Some of the archaeological items found on the mountain are now in the National Museum in Dublin.

Radar domes 
In the late 1970s, as part of the development of Eurocontrol (the European air traffic control system), two radar domes were built on the top of the mountain.

In September 1982 the Irish National Liberation Army, an Irish republican paramilitary group, blew up the radar domes, wrongly claiming that they were being used by NATO in violation of Irish neutrality.

See also
 List of Cork archaeological sites

References

External links 
 Schull's Website, schull.ie
 Schull.org
 References to mining, goodprovenance.com
 Official website — National Museum of Ireland, museum.ie

See also 
List of mountains in Ireland

Gabriel
National Monuments in County Cork
Gabriel